The 1980 Colchester Borough Council election to the Colchester Borough Council were held in 1980 alongside other local elections across the country.

Summary

Ward results

Berechurch

Castle

Dedham

No Independent candidate as previous (-33.0).

East Donyland

Fordham

 

 

No Liberal candidate as previous (-44.8).

Harbour

Lexden

Marks Tey

Mile End

New Town

Prettygate

Shrub End

St. Andrews

St. Annes

St. Johns

St. Marys

Stanway

Tiptree

No Liberal candidate as previous (-12.5).

West Mersea

Wivenhoe

References

1980 English local elections
1980
1980s in Essex